Aonidiina is a subtribe of armored scale insects.

Genera
Aonidia
Cryptaspidiotus
Cupressaspis
Diaonidia
Felixiella
Greeniella
Maskellia
Phaulaspis

References

Aspidiotini